Abakabaka is a genus of erebid moths in the subfamily Lymantriinae. Both species are known from Madagascar.

Species
 Abakabaka fuliginosa Saalmüller 1884
 Abakabaka phasiana (Butler, 1882)

References

External links
 Natural History Museum Lepidoptera genus database
 

Lymantriinae
Moth genera